Formula 750 was a FIM motorcycle road racing series based on a 750 cubic centimeter engine capacity.

History
The series began in 1971 as a collaboration between the American Motorcyclist Association and the Auto Cycle Union. The FIM adopted the Formula 750 class for events in 1972. 

In 1973 it became a British-based series. In 1975 the series was upgraded to European championship status and in 1977, it attained world championship status. 

The Formula 750 class was seen as possibly overtaking the 500cc Grand Prix class as the premier racing division. However, the ultimate domination by one model (the Yamaha TZ750) as well as the increasingly popular superbike production class meant that the FIM discontinued the class after the 1979 season.

Formula 750 champions
Source:

References

External links
 FIM page about the development of the category - partial access only Archived from the original on 25 February 2020

 
Motorcycle road racing series
750